Open House is a 2004 real estate musical film starring Hedy Burress, Ann Magnuson, Anthony Rapp, Sally Kellerman, Jenna Leigh Green and Kellie Martin, and directed by Dan Mirvish, a co-founder of the Slamdance Film Festival.  It played on the film festival circuit in 2004–05 and was released on DVD through Wellspring Media.  All the actors sang live on set, rather than lip synching.

Cast
Hedy Burress ... Gloria Hobbs
James Duval ... Joel Rodman
Jerry Doyle ... Dave Torkenson 
Jenna Leigh Green ... Betty
Daniel Hagen ... Marvin Tibett
Sally Kellerman ... Marjorie Milford
Ann Magnuson ... Sarah Jane Tibbett
Kellie Martin ... Debbie Delaney
Robert Peters ... Ron Tucker
Anthony Rapp ... Barry Farnsworth
Ian Whitcomb ... Dr. Santee
Branden Williams ... Stanley Nasser
Joel Michaely ... Lamar
Eddie Daniels ... Colanda Jones, the Ho
Kyle Fox...Happy McVicker

References

External links

2004 films
2000s musical films
Films scored by Joe Kraemer